Pastiglie Leone is an Italian candy manufacturer of candies, jellies, gummy sweets, liquorice, fine chocolate and sugar- and calorie-free pastilles. The candies are produced in a variety of flavors.

Pastiglie Leone was founded by Luigi Leone in 1857 in Alba before moving to Turin. The company also was an Italian Royal Warrant of Appointment holder.

Flavors
Many flavors are offered by Pastiglie Leone including:  Absinthe, Alpine Herbs, Anise, Balsamic, Currant, Blueberry, Cedar Mint, Cedar Sage, Cinnamon, Cloves, Chamomile, Coffee,  Fernet, Gentian, Green Tea, Lemon, Liquorice, Mint, Orange, Orange blossom, Polar Relief (Menthol and Eucalyptus), Propolis (Honey), Raspberry, Rhubarb, Spices, Strawberry, Tangerine, Vanilla, and Violet.

References

External links

 
 Facebook page: Pastiglie Leone

Brand name confectionery
Candy
Gummi candies
Liquorice (confectionery)
Throat lozenges
Food and drink companies established in 1857
Italian companies established in 1857
1857 introductions
Italian Royal Warrant holders
Italian brands
Confectionery companies of Italy